Eman Mohamed El-Nossiry (born ) is a retired Egyptian female volleyball player. She was part of the Egypt women's national volleyball team.

She participated in the 2003 FIVB Volleyball Women's World Cup. She played for Ahly club, Cairo, EGY in 2003.

References

External links
http://www.fivb.org/EN/Volleyball/Competitions/WorldCup/2003/women2/Teams/VB_Player.asp?No=14096

1987 births
Living people
Egyptian women's volleyball players
Place of birth missing (living people)